Myrteta is a genus of moths in the family Geometridae. It was first described by Francis Walker in 1861.

Palpi slender and porrect (extending forward), not reaching beyond the frons. Forewings with vein 3 from just before angle of cell. Veins 7 to 9 stalked from just before upper angle. Vein 10 and 11 stalked and anastomosing (fusing) with vein 12. Hindwings with vein 8 from before angle of cell.

Species
Myrteta angelica Butler, 1881
Myrteta argentaria Leech, 1897
Myrteta interferenda Wehrli, 1939
Myrteta leroyi (D. S. Fletcher, 1958)
Myrteta parallelaria (Warren, 1902)
Myrteta planaria Walker, 1861
Myrteta punctata (Warren, 1894)
Myrteta sinensaria Leech, 1897
Myrteta tripunctaria Leech, 1897

References

Caberini